Jean Lemaire may refer to:
 Jean Lemaire de Belges (1473–1524), Walloon expressionist poet
 Jean Lemaire (painter), known as Lemaire-Poussin (1601(?)–1659), French painter
 Jean Lemaire (lawyer) (1904–1986), lawyer to Philippe Pétain

See also
Lemaire (surname)